Elections to North Tyneside Metropolitan Council took place on 2 May 2002 on the same day as other local council elections in England.

North Tyneside Council is elected "in thirds", which means one councillor from each three-member ward is elected each year followed by a following year. On the same day, the election for the first directly elected Mayor of North Tyneside took place.

Battle Hill

Benton

Camperdown

Chirton

Collingwood

Cullercoats

Holystone

Howdon

Longbenton

Monkseaton

North Shields

Northumberland

Riverside

Seatonville

St Mary's

Tynemouth

Valley

Wallsend

Weetslade

Whitley Bay

References 

2002
2002 English local elections
21st century in Tyne and Wear